The Very Best of Eddie Cochran is a compilation album of songs by the rock and roll singer Eddie Cochran. It was released in the United Kingdom on 2 June 2008 on the EMI label and contains 30 tracks.

Track listing 

 Summertime Blues
 C'mon Everybody
 Weekend
 Somethin' Else
 My Way
 Drive In Show
 Cut Across Shorty
 Twenty Flight Rock
 Jeanie, Jeanie, Jeanie 
 Three Stars
 Let's Get Together
 Blue Suede Shoes
 Long Tall Sally
 Theresa
 Teenage Cutie
 Hallelujah, I Love Her So
 Have I Told You Lately that I Love You
 Am I Blue
 Mean When I'm Mad
 Little Lou
 Sweetie Pie
 Nervous Breakdown
 Teenage Heaven
 Sittin' In The Balcony
 Lonely
 Three Steps to Heaven
 Completely Sweet
 Heart Breakin' Mama
 Boll Weevil Song
 Skinny Jim

2008 compilation albums
EMI Records compilation albums